Riau Strait is a strait in Riau Archipelago. The Riau Strait separates islands of Batam and Bintan. It is an important commercial waterway to the port of Singapore.

The planned Batam-Bintan Bridge would be the first bridge to cross the strait.

References

Straits of Indonesia
Straits of the Indian Ocean
Geography of Riau